The Polish Development Fund (PFR) is a state-owned financial group, headquartered in Warsaw, which offers instruments supporting the development of companies, local governments and individuals, and invests in sustainable social development and national economic growth.

Summary 
The mission of the PFR as a Polish promotional financial institution is to implement programs enhancing the long-term investment and economic potential and supporting equal opportunities and environmental protection. PFR was established in April 2016 as part of the government’s Plan for Responsible Development drafted by Deputy Prime Minister, Minister of Economic Development and Finance Mateusz Morawiecki. Paweł Borys has been the first President of the Management Board of PFR since 1 May 2016.

The PFR Group is a new entity which continues, in a new format, the tradition of Bank Gospodarstwa Krajowego, established in 1924 as a part of the reform program of Prime Minister Władysław Grabski. Most countries of the world have similar development institutions. The biggest development institutions in Europe which have similar operating standards to those of the PFR Group include the German KfW (Kreditanstalt für Wiederaufbau) group, the French CDC (Caisse des Dépôts et Consignation) group, the Italian CDP (Cassa Depositi e Prestiti) group, and the Hungarian MFB (Magyar Fejlesztési Bank) group.

Activity 
The Polish Development Fund Group operates within the new architecture of Polish development institutions. Its coherent strategy and instrument platform integrate the Industrial Development Agency (Agencja Rozwoju Przemysłu, ARP), Bank Gospodarstwa Krajowego (BGK), Export Credit Insurance Corporation (Korporacja Ubezpieczeń Kredytów Eksportowych, KUKE), Polish Investment and Trade Agency (Polska Agencja Inwestycji i Handlu), and the Polish Agency for Enterprise Development (Polska Agencja Rozwoju Przedsiębiorczości, PARP).

See also
National Centre for Research and Development

References

External links 

Investment promotion agencies
Government agencies established in 2016
2016 establishments in Poland